Mickey Mousecapade, released in Japan as , is a platform video game developed and published by Hudson Soft originally in 1987 for the Family Computer (Famicom) in Japan. Capcom published the game for the Nintendo Entertainment System (NES) in the United States in 1988. 

The game's plot involves Mickey Mouse attempting to save Alice from Alice in Wonderland. Minnie Mouse follows Mickey around and occasionally gets kidnapped. Various villains from Disney cartoons and animated films appear throughout the game as bosses.

Summary

Mickey and Minnie are traveling through the Fun House, the Ocean, the Forest, the Pirate Ship, and the Castle trying to rescue someone mentioned only as "a friend" in ads and the instruction manual. In the game's ending, the friend is revealed to be Alice from Alice in Wonderland. In the Japanese version, Alice is prominently featured on the box art and instruction manual.

Reception

Allgame's Skyler Miller described the visuals as serviceable, but the music as overly repetitive. Miller awarded the game two out of five stars. IGN rated it the 86th greatest NES game of all time.

See also
List of Disney video games

Notes

References

External links

1987 video games
Alice in Wonderland (franchise)
Disney games by Capcom
Disney video games
Hudson Soft games
Mickey Mouse video games
Nintendo Entertainment System games
Nintendo Entertainment System-only games
Platform games
Single-player video games
Video games developed in Japan
Video games featuring female protagonists
Video games scored by Takeaki Kunimoto